Corticotropin-releasing hormone receptor 1 (CRHR1) is a protein, also known as CRF1, with the latter (CRF1) now being the IUPHAR-recommended name.  In humans, CRF1 is encoded by the CRHR1 gene at region 17q21.31, beside micrototubule-associated protein tau MAPT.

Structure 
The human CRHR1 gene contains 14 exons over 20 kb of DNA, and its full gene product is a peptide composed of 444 amino acids. Excision of exon 6 yields in the mRNA for the primary functional CRF1, which is a peptide composed of 415 amino acids, arranged in seven hydrophobic alpha-helices.

The CRHR1 gene is alternatively spliced into a series of variants. These variants are generated through deletion of one of the 14 exons, which in some cases causes a frame-shift in the open reading frame, and encode corresponding isoforms of CRF1. Though these isoforms have not been identified in native tissues, the mutations of the splice variants of mRNA suggest the existence of alternate CRF receptors, with differences in intracellular loops or deletions in N-terminus or transmembrane domains. Such structural changes suggest that the alternate CRF1 receptors have different degrees of capacity and efficiency in binding CRF and its agonists. Though the functions of these CRF1 receptors is yet unknown, they are suspected to be biologically significant.

CRF1 is 70% homologous with the second human CRF receptor family, CRF2; the greatest divergence between the two lies at the N-terminus of the protein.

Mechanism of activation 
CRF1 is activated through the binding of CRF or a CRF-agonist. The ligand binding and subsequent receptor conformational change depends on three different sites in the second and third extracellular domains of CRF1.

In the majority of tissues, CRF1 is coupled to a stimulatory G-protein that activates the adenylyl cyclase signaling pathway, and ligand-binding triggers an increase in cAMP levels. However, the signal can be transmitted along multiple signal transduction cascades, according to the structure of the receptor and the region of its expression. Alternate signaling pathways activated by CRF1 include PKC and MAPK. This wide variety of cascades suggests that CRF1 mediates tissue-specific responses to CRF and CRF-agonists.

Tissue distribution 
CRF1 is expressed widely throughout both the central and peripheral nervous systems. In the central nervous system, CRF1 is particularly found in the cortex, cerebellum, amygdala, hippocampus, olfactory bulb, ventral tegmental area, brainstem areas, paraventricular hypothalamus, and pituitary. In the pituitary, CRF1 stimulation triggers the activation of the POMC gene, which in turn causes the release of ACTH and β-endorphins from the anterior pituitary. In the peripheral nervous system, CRF1 is expressed at low levels in a wide variety of tissues, including the skin, spleen, heart, liver, adipose tissue, placenta, ovary, testis, and adrenal gland.

In CRF1 knockout mice, and mice treated with a CRF1 antagonist, there is a decrease in anxious behavior and a blunted stress response, suggesting that CRF1 mechanisms are anxiogenic. However, the effect of CRF1 appears to be regionally specific and cell-type specific, likely due to the wide variety of cascades and signaling pathways activated by the binding of CRF or CRF-agonists. In mice, offspring born to CRF1 -/- knockout mothers typically die within a few days of birth from lung dysplasia, likely due to low glucocorticoid levels. In the central nervous system, CRF1 activation mediates fear learning and consolidation in the extended amygdala, stress-related modulation of memory formation in the hippocampus, and brainstem regulation of arousal.

Function 
The corticotropin-releasing hormone receptor binds corticotropin-releasing hormone, a potent mediator of endocrine, autonomic, behavioral, and immune responses to stress.

CRF1 receptors in mice mediate ethanol enhancement of GABAergic synaptic transmission.

Postpartum function 
Postpartum CRF1 knockout mice spend less time nursing and less time licking and grooming their offspring than their wildtype counterparts during the first few days postpartum. These pups weighed less as a result. This pattern of maternal behavior indicates that CRF1 may be needed for early postpartum mothers to display typical mothering behaviors. Maternal aggression is attenuated by increases in CRF and urocortin 2, which bind to CRF1.

Evolution 

Corticotrophin releasing hormone (CRH) evolved ~ in an organism that subsequently gave rise to both chordates and arthropods. The binding site for this was single CRH like receptor. In vertebrates this gene was duplicated leading to the extant CRH1 and CRH2 forms. Additionally four paralogous ligands developed including CRH, urotensin-1/urocortin, urocortin II and urocortin III.

Clinical significance 

Variations in the CRHR1 gene is associated with enhanced response to inhaled corticosteroid therapy in asthma.

CRF1 triggers cells to release hormones that are linked to stress and anxiety [original reference missing]. Hence CRF1 receptor antagonists are being actively studied as possible treatments for depression and anxiety.

Variations in CRHR1 are associated with persistent pulmonary hypertension of the newborn.

Interactions 

Corticotropin-releasing hormone receptor 1 has been shown to interact with Corticotropin-releasing hormone and urocortin.

See also 
 Corticotropin-releasing hormone
 Corticotropin-releasing hormone receptor
 Corticotropin-releasing hormone antagonist
 Antalarmin
 Pexacerfont
 Verucerfont

References

Further reading

External links 
 
 
 
 

G protein-coupled receptors
Corticotropin-releasing hormone